Asteria Regio is a region on the planet Venus. It is bordered on the southeast by Phoebe Regio. It is located in the Hecate Chasma (v28) quadrangle.

References

Guinevere Planitia quadrangle
Surface features of Venus